The Veyron is a river in the canton of Vaud, in Switzerland.

Geography 
The Veyron starts its course in Bière, Vaud, and flows down to Ferreyres, where it merges into  the Venoge, in the area known as Tine de Conflens.

History 
The Veyron was called in ancient Vaud patois "li Voirons" in 1257.

Flows through 
Bière
Ballens
Apples
Pampigny
Chavannes-le-Veyron
Grancy
La Chaux (Cossonay)
Dizy
Chevilly
La Sarraz
Ferreyres

Confluents
the Etremble
the Malagne
the Morand
the Lamponnex
the Gèbre

Rivers of Switzerland
Rivers of the canton of Vaud